The Czech Republic competed at the 2019 World Aquatics Championships in Gwangju, South Korea from 12 to 28 July.

Artistic swimming

The Czech Republic's artistic swimming team consisted of 4 athletes (4 female).

Women

High diving

The Czech Republic qualified one male high diver.

Open water swimming

Czech Republic qualified two male and two female open water swimmers.

Men

Women

Swimming

Czech Republic entered seven swimmers.

Men

Women

References

World Aquatics Championships
2019
Nations at the 2019 World Aquatics Championships